Simon Westwell (born 12 November 1961) is an English former professional footballer who played in the Football League as a right back.

References

1961 births
Living people
English footballers
Association football defenders
Preston North End F.C. players
Chorley F.C. players
Colne Dynamoes F.C. players
Accrington Stanley F.C. players
Clitheroe F.C. players
English Football League players